The 1969 Motor State 500 was a NASCAR Grand National Series event that was held on June 15, 1969, at Michigan International Speedway in Brooklyn, Michigan. Highlights from this event were featured on the television show Car and Track; hosted by race commentator Bud Lindemann.

Background
Groundbreaking took place on September 28, 1967. Over  of dirt were moved to form the D-shaped oval. The track opened in 1968 with a total capacity of 25,000 seats. The track was originally built and owned by Lawrence H. LoPatin, a Detroit-area land developer who built the speedway at an estimated cost of $4–6 million. Financing was arranged by Thomas W Itin. Its first race took place on Sunday, October 13, 1968, with the running of the USAC 250 mile Championship Car Race won by Ronnie Bucknum.

Race report
38 drivers competed in this 250-lap event. Wayne Gillette Was the last-place finisher due to troubles with the rear end of the vehicle after completing a single lap. While LeeRoy Yarbrough would lead the most laps, Cale Yarborough would defeat David Pearson by five car lengths after more than three and a half hours of racing. Cale Yarborough and LeeRoy Yarbrough got together during the final lap and LeeRoy tried to limp back to the finish line but came up just short.

A faulty vehicular oil line managed to take Buddy Young out of the race on lap 62. Bobby Wawak fell out with engine failure on lap 74 while Bobby Allison did the same thing on lap 78. Dick Johnson noticed that his vehicle's clutch was having problems; forcing him to leave the race on lap 80. Between lap 94 and lap 150, five of the competing drivers would notice that their engines stopped working. Some faulty lug bolts would relegate Ben Arnold to the sidelines on lap 155. Bill Seifert, Paul Deal Holt, Dave Marcis and Henley Gray would end up blowing their engines between lap 183 and lap 191. Yarbrough's day would end when his car suddenly crashed on lap 249; but not without picking up a respectable fourth-place finish in the process.

Earl Brooks would become known for being the lowest-finishing driver to complete the event; he was 85 laps behind the lead lap drivers. The vehicles in this event ranged from 1967 to 1969; most of the vehicles raced here were Fords and Dodges; all built nearby in the assembly plants of Dearborn, Flint and Detroit. The racing grid was forced to slow down a total of seven times for a duration of 35 laps; more than 46,000 people would purchase tickets for the inaugural NASCAR Cup Series race set in the "Irish Hills" of Michigan. LeeRoy Yarbrough and David Pearson both lead a respectable number of green flags and were tough opponents to deal with while under pressure. With the first-place position being exchanged a whopping 35 times throughout the event, it felt more like an Academy Award-winning movie than an actual NASCAR event.

Individual race earnings for each driver ranged from the winner's share of $17,625 ($ when adjusted for inflation) to the last-place finisher's share of $622 ($ when adjusted for inflation). A total of $73,548 in winnings went to all the drivers ($ when adjusted for inflation).

Notable crew chiefs attending this race included Cotton Owens, Dick Hutcherson, Glen Wood, Banjo Matthews and Dale Inman.

Qualifying

Results

References

Motor State 500
Motor State 500
NASCAR races at Michigan International Speedway